Sille Dam (Turkish: Sille Barajı) is a dam in Konya Province in Turkey.

External links
 Entry for Sille Dam on the website of the Turkish Commission on Large Dams 

Dams in Konya Province